Anders Bernhard Svela (11 September 1939 – 7 September 2010) was a Norwegian footballer and teacher.

In his younger days he competed in both athletics (Sandnes IL), gymnastics and handball. He played at the highest tier in football, winning promotion with Stavanger, before moving to Oslo to study. Here he played 187 games for first-tier club Frigg. He was also capped twice for Norway. After retiring, he coached Ulf-Sandnes, Figgjo IL, Klepp IL, Ålgård FK and Egersunds IK between 1967 and 1982.

At the University of Oslo he graduated with the cand.philol. degree and spent his professional career as a teacher at Sandnes Upper Secondary School from 1967 to 2005. His favorite subject was French, and he was awarded the Ordre des Palmes Académiques.

He was married and had two daughters. He died in September 2010, shortly before his 71st birthday.

References

External links
 

1939 births
2010 deaths
People from Sandnes
Norwegian footballers
Stavanger IF players
Frigg Oslo FK players
Norway international footballers
Norwegian football managers
Sandnes Ulf managers
Egersunds IK managers
University of Oslo alumni
Norwegian schoolteachers
Recipients of the Ordre des Palmes Académiques
Association footballers not categorized by position
Sportspeople from Rogaland